The Criminal Justice (Theft and Fraud Offences) Act, 2001 (No. 50 of 2001) updates and consolidates the law relating to dishonesty and fraud in the Republic of Ireland.

The main sections of the statute include:

Theft and Related Offences
Making gain or causing loss by deception
Making off without payment
Unlawful use of computer
False accounting
Suppression of documents
Burglary
Robbery
Possession of certain articles
Handling Stolen Property and other Proceeds of Crime
Forgery
Counterfeiting

See also 
Garda Bureau of Fraud Investigation (GBFI)
Criminal Justice Act Republic of Ireland
Deception (criminal law) Republic of Ireland
Michael Fahy Misappropriation conviction

References

External links 
 Criminal Justice (Theft and Fraud Offences) Act, 2001

2001 in Irish law
Acts of the Oireachtas of the 2000s
Irish criminal law
Fraud in the Republic of Ireland
Fraud legislation